Te Ure o Uenukukōpako is a Māori iwi of the Te Arawa confederation in the Bay of Plenty of New Zealand.

Chief Uenukukōpako was a great-great-great-great grandson of Tamatekapua, captain of the Arawa canoe. His kurī dog was killed by Mataaho and Kawaarero, which was part of a long war in the Rotorua district. Uenukukōpako and his relative Rangiteaorere did eventually win the war and secured the settlement of the region for their descendants. Today Uenukukōpako's descendants (Te Ure o Uenukukōpako / Ngāti Whakaue) populate Mokoia Island and the north-west side of Lake Rotorua.

Te Arawa FM is the radio station of Te Arawa iwi. It was established in the early 1980s and became a charitable entity in November 1990.

See also

List of Māori iwi

References

 
Iwi and hapū